East Hills is a village in Nassau County, on the North Shore of Long Island, in New York, United States. It is considered part of the Greater Roslyn area, which is anchored by the Incorporated Village of Roslyn. The population was 6,955 at the 2010 census.

The Incorporated Village of East Hills is located primarily within the Town of North Hempstead, with the exception being a small section of the village's northeastern corner, located within the Town of Oyster Bay.

History

Before the village 
In 1643, John Carman and Robert Fordham sailed across the Long Island Sound from Stamford, Connecticut and purchased the land that is now occupied by the Towns of Hempstead and North Hempstead from the Marsappeaque, Matinecock, Mericock, and Rockoway Native Americans. This land included what is now East Hills.

For a long time, much of what now is East Hills was home to a few wealthy families. In 1898, Clarence and Katherine Mackay settled in present-day East Hills and would eventually commission Stanford White to design their mansion, Harbor Hill. In 1924, the Prince of Wales, who later abdicated the throne of England to marry Mrs. Simpson, was entertained at the Mackay estate. Aviation pioneer Charles A. Lindbergh even rested at the Mackay estate in 1927 after returning to the United States following his historic solo flight to Paris, France.

Village of East Hills (1931 – present) 
The Village of East Hills was incorporated on June 24, 1931, and its first election was held a couple weeks later on July 8 in barns at the Mackay estate. Reasons for incorporating included the desire by many locals to be excluded from paying taxes for sanitary sewer systems, highways, etc., the desire to not be part of the Roslyn Sewer District and to keep businesses out, and to maintain home rule powers. Many of the proposals which the locals were against were proposed when Roslyn wanted to incorporate, as early plans called for that village's proposed boundaries to include what would become East Hills. As such, the residents decided to incorporate East Hills as a separate village.

Mr. Willets was elected as Mayor and John Mackay, Stephen Willets, Ellen A. Hennessy, and Catherine Hechler were elected as the Village Trustees. Charles Hechler, the husband of Mrs. Hechler, was appointed as the Village Clerk.

The name of East Hills was chosen based on its geography and location. The "East" reflects the village's geographic location adjacent to and east of Roslyn, and the "Hills" reflects the hilly geography of the village.

The post-war era ushered in a huge population boom and suburbanization throughout the United States, which led to the construction of many new developments in the Village of East Hills. One of these developments, Strathmore, was developed by Levitt & Sons in the late 1940s. 

Another notable development built during this time, the Country Estates subdivision, was developed by Country Estates, Incorporated over Clarence Mackay's former estate. Prior to building the Country Estates in East Hills, the firm developed the Flower Hill Country Estates subdivision in nearby Flower Hill.

A third notable development, Norgate, was developed by Gustav A. Mezger and the Homeguard Realty Corporation.

Additionally, in order for the Roslyn Union Free School District to adequately serve the influx of families, the Moore & Hutchins-designed East Hills Elementary School was opened between the Canterbury Woods and Fairfield Park developments in 1953.

On Labor Day 2006, the Park at East Hills opened on the land previously occupied by the Roslyn Air National Guard Station. It has a pool, nature walks, senior facilities, and tennis and basketball courts. The construction of the park was financed through the sale of bonds; carrying and operating costs are paid through taxes.

Geography

The portions of the village on Harbor Hill, the former site of Clarence Mackay's estate of the same name, are among the highest areas in Nassau County and Long Island, as a whole.

Additionally, the Harbor Hill Moraine is named for this hill, as it is one of the terminal moraine's most prominent and famous topographic features.

The village gained territory from the adjacent Incorporated Village of Brookville between the 1960 census and the 1970 census; this small area is the portion of the village within the Town of Oyster Bay.

Demographics

2010 census 
As of the census of 2010, there were 6,955 people residing in the village. The racial makeup of the village was 89.85% White, 0.95% African American, 7.40% Asian, 0.49% from other races, and 1.31% from two or more races. Hispanic or Latino of any race were 2.24% of the population.

Census 2000 
As of the census of 2000, there were 6,842 people, 2,245 households, and 2,029 families residing in the village. The population density was 2,991.5 people per square mile (1,153.6/km2). There were 2,275 housing units at an average density of 994.7 per square mile (383.6/km2). The racial makeup of the village was 92.94% White, 0.8% African American, 0.01% Native American, 4.82% Asian, 0.01% Pacific Islander, 0.57% from other races, and 0.83% from two or more races. Hispanic or Latino of any race were 1.48% of the population.

There were 2,245 households, out of which 46.2% had children under the age of 18 living with them, 84.4% were married couples living together, 4.9% had a female householder with no husband present, and 9.6% were non-families. 8.5% of all households were made up of individuals, and 5.4% had someone living alone who was 65 years of age or older. The average household size was 3.04 and the average family size was 3.2.

In the village, the population was spread out, with 29.9% under the age of 18, 3.9% from 18 to 24, 23.2% from 25 to 44, 28.6% from 45 to 64, and 14.4% who were 65 years of age or older. The median age was 41 years. For every 100 females, there were 97.1 males. For every 100 females age 18 and over, there were 92.6 males.

The median income for a household in the village was $149,726, and the median income for a family was $159,316. Males had a median income of $100,000 versus $52,115 for females. The per capita income for the village was $59,297. About 1.5% of families and 1.6% of the population were below the poverty line, including 1.1% of those under age 18 and 3.0% of those age 65 or over.

Government

Village government 
As of August 2022, the Mayor of East Hills is Michael R. Koblenz. Koblenz has held this position since 1995, and as of 2022 has an annual salary of $60,000. He previously lived in nearby Flower Hill and served as one of its Village Trustees in the 1980s. Also as of August 2022, the Deputy Mayor of East Hills is Emmanuel Zuckerman, and the Village Trustees of East Hills are Brian Meyerson, Clara Pomerantz, Stacey Siegel, and Emmanuel Zuckerman.

The following is a list of East Hills' mayors, from 1931 to present:

Representation in higher government

North Hempstead Town Board 
As of August 2022, the part of East Hills located within the Town of North Hempstead is located within the town's 2nd council district, and is represented on the North Hempstead Town Council by one of its former Village Trustees, Peter J. Zuckerman (D–East Hills).

County representation 
As of August 2022, the Village of East Hills is located within Nassau County's 18th Legislative district, and as of August 2022 is represented in the Nassau County Legislature by Joshua A. Lafazan (D–Woodbury).

New York State representation

New York State Assembly 
East Hills is split between the New York State Assembly's 13th, 16th, and 19th Assembly districts, which as of August 2022 are represented by Charles Lavine (D–Glen Cove), Gina Sillitti (D–Manorhaven), and Edward Ra (R–Garden City South), respectively. The 13th and 16th districts cover the portions of East Hills within the Town of North Hempstead while the 19th district covers the small area of East Hills within the Town of Oyster Bay.

As of January 2023, the village will be located within Assembly Districts 13 and 16, due to redistricting; Assembly District 19 will no longer cover portions of the village.

New York State Senate 
East Hills is primarily located within the New York State Senate's 7th State Senate district, which as of August 2022 is represented in the New York State Senate by Anna Kaplan (D–North Hills). However, the small portion of the village within the Town of Oyster Bay is located within the 5th State Senate district, which as of August 2022 is represented in the New York State Senate by James Gaughran (D–Northport).

As of January 2023, the entire village will be located within Senate District 7, due to redistricting.

Federal representation

United States Congress 
East Hills is located in New York's 3rd congressional district, which as of August 2022 is represented in the United States Congress by Tom Suozzi (D–Glen Cove).

United States Senate 
Like the rest of New York, East Hills is represented in the United States Senate by Charles Schumer (D) and Kirsten Gillibrand (D).

Politics 
In the 2016 U.S. presidential election, the majority of East Hills voters voted for Hillary Clinton (D).

Parks and recreation 

 Arlene Park
 The Park at East Hills
Additionally, the recreation areas at the East Hills and Harbor Hill Elementary Schools, Roslyn Middle School, St. Mary's Parochial School, and some portions of the recreation areas at Roslyn High School, are located within the village, as well as a few landscaped traffic islands.

Education

School districts 

East Hills is primarily within the boundaries of (and is thus served by) the Roslyn Union Free School District. However, some of the southeastern portions of the village are served by the East Williston Union Free School District and the small portion within the Town of Oyster Bay is served by the Jericho Union Free School District. As such, children who live in East Hills and attend public schools will go to school in one of these three districts depending on where they live within the village.

Library districts 
East Hills is primarily within the boundaries of (and is thus served by) Roslyn's library district. However, some of the southeastern portions of the village are served by the Shelter Rock Library District and the Westbury Library District, and the small portion within the Town of Oyster Bay is served by the Jericho Library District.

Infrastructure

Transportation

Road

Federal roads 

 Long Island Expressway (Interstate 495) – Travels through the southern portion of the village, between Glen Cove Road (at its eastern border) and Roslyn Road (at its western border).

State roads 
Two state-owned roads pass through and serve the village:

  Northern Boulevard (NY 25A) – Forms portions of the northern border of the village, with Greenvale and Old Brookville.
  Northern State Parkway – Forms the southern boundary of the village, with Roslyn Heights.

Other roads 
Other major roads which are located within (or pass through) the Village of East Hills include Chestnut Drive, Glen Cove Road, Harbor Hill Road, Locust Lane, Old Powerhouse Road, Old Westbury Road, Roslyn Road, and Round Hill Road.

Rail 
While there are no Long Island Rail Road stations located within the village limits, the Oyster Bay Branch does form portions of the Roslyn-East Hills border.

The nearest station to the village is the Roslyn station on the Oyster Bay Branch, located in the adjacent, unincorporated hamlet of Roslyn Heights.

Bus 

East Hills is served by the n20H and n27 bus routes, which are operated by Nassau Inter-County Express (NICE). The n20H travels along the village's northern border via Northern Boulevard. The n27 travels through the heart of the village along Harbor Hill Road, as well as along Glen Cove Road.

Utility services

Natural gas 
National Grid provides natural gas to homes and businesses that are hooked up to natural gas lines in the Village of East Hills.

Power 
PSEG Long Island provides power to all homes and businesses within the Village of East Hills.

Sewage 
Most places in East Hills are not connected to a sanitary sewer system – although there were failed plans in the 1970s to create a sewer district for much of northwestern Nassau County, which would have included East Hills in the second phase of the $122 million (1972 USD) project. As such, the majority of homes and businesses in East Hills rely on cesspools and septic systems.

The few properties in East Hills which are connected to sanitary sewers are connected to the Nassau County Sewage District's sanitary sewage network, via its East Hills Interceptor line.

Trash collection 
Trash collection services in East Hills are provided and operated by the village.

Water 
The Village of East Hills is served by four water districts:

 The Roslyn Water District – Serves the portions of East Hills in the Town of North Hempstead, excluding the Northern State Parkway and the New York State Department of Transportation's maintenance yard on Glen Cove Road.
 The Jericho Water District – Serves the portions of East Hills in the Town of Oyster Bay.
 The Village of Old Westbury Water System – Serves the New York State Department of Transportation's maintenance yard on Glen Cove Road.

Additionally, some portions of the Northern State Parkway within the village are within the northern extremes of the Albertson Water District.

Landmarks 

Despite the fact that the Mackay family's Stanford White-designed mansion was demolished prior to the construction of the Country Estates subdivision, three remaining buildings from the former Harbor Hill estate still stand, and were listed on the National Register of Historic Places in 1991:
 Mackay Estate Dairyman's Cottage
 Mackay Estate Gate Lodge
 Mackay Estate Water Tower

Additionally, another home from the estate remains: the John Mackay III House, which is located at 2A Melby Lane.

Another landmark in East Hills is the Townsend Cemetery, located near the northeastern corner of the village.

Notable people 

 James V. Forrestal – First United States Secretary of Defense, serving between 1947 and 1949. Forrestal lived at his East Hills home, "Old Brick" until his sudden death in Maryland in 1949.
Wendy Liebman – Comedian.
Clarence H. Mackay – Financier. Mackay Lived in Harbor Hill.
 Katherine Duer Mackay – Suffragist and socialite; Clarence's ex-wife.

References

External links

 Official website

Town of North Hempstead, New York
Oyster Bay (town), New York
Villages in New York (state)
Villages in Nassau County, New York